Cięcina  is a village in the administrative district of Gmina Węgierska Górka, within Żywiec County, Silesian Voivodeship, in southern Poland. The village has a population of 4,373.

It is one of the oldest villages in Żywiec Basin. It was established in the 13th century, and in the next century it became a seat of a Catholic parish. There is a wooden Saint Catherine Church from the 16th century, an important landmark in the village.

Notable industry
Żywiec Zdrój

References

Villages in Żywiec County